Drujba may refer to:
 Hîrceşti, a commune in Ungheni district, Moldova
 Drujba, Vidin Province in Vidin Municipality, Bulgaria